Virgibacillus xinjiangensis is a Gram-positive, moderately halophilic spore forming and strictly aerobic bacterium from the genus of Virgibacillus which has been isolated from a salt lake from the Xinjiang Province in China.

References

Bacillaceae
Bacteria described in 2010